Endapalli is a village in Kadapa district of the Indian state of Andhra Pradesh. It is located in Rayachoti mandal.

References 

Villages in Kadapa district